Argia extranea, the spine-tipped dancer, is a species of narrow-winged damselfly in the family Coenagrionidae. It is found in the Americas.

The IUCN conservation status of Argia extranea is "LC", least concern, with no immediate threat to the species' survival. The population is stable.

References

Further reading

External links

 

Coenagrionidae
Articles created by Qbugbot
Insects described in 1861